The coat of arms of the Philippines features the eight-rayed sun of the Philippines with each ray representing the eight provinces (Batangas, Bulacan, Cavite, Manila, Laguna, Nueva Ecija, Pampanga, and Tarlac) which were placed under martial law by Governor-General Ramón Blanco Sr. during the Philippine Revolution, and the three five-pointed stars representing the three major island groups of Luzon, the Visayas, and Mindanao.

On the blue field on the dexter side is the North American bald eagle of the United States, and on the red field on the sinister side is the lion rampant of the coat of arms of the Kingdom of León of Spain, both representing the country's colonial past. The current arms, which shares many features of the national flag, was designed by Filipino artist and heraldist Captain Galo B. Ocampo.

Blazon
The blazon of the coat of arms from Flag and Heraldic Code of the Philippines (Republic Act 8491) is as follows:

Its original blazoning according to Commonwealth Act No. 731 is:

History

Spanish Colonial Period

The Philippines' codified heraldry when King Philip II of Spain authorized the first coat of arms to the City of Manila through a royal decree issued on 20 March 1596 is, in part, as follows:

The design of the arms of Manila had changed throughout the years, the castle had adopted various different forms, a crowned sea lion was present later, and in the 19th century, King Ferdinand VII granted the use and placement of the royal crown above the castle itself as an augmentation of honor by royal cedula of April 23, 1826.

Along with this, the lesser arms of the Spanish monarch was used. The design patterned after the national standard of Spain consisted of three fleur-de-lis surrounded by a quartered flag of Castille, represented by two golden castles located on the red field and two red lions on a white field. Minor details of the arms had changed over the years but the basic design elements remained.

Philippine Revolutionary Period
During the 1896 Philippine Revolution, the Filipino leaders had no permanent political symbol, but, two different emblems were easily adopted. Both consisted of an equilateral triangle, but differed on what symbols were placed inside the triangle. Many documents of the Katipunan bore a letter K which stood for Kalayaan (Liberty), while some had the rising mythological sun in the center. General Emilio Aguinaldo, officially the first President of the Philippines, adopted the mythological sun and the three stars in each angle of the equilateral triangle as his emblem.

American Colonial Period
During the American Occupation, a law was enacted prescribing a new coat of arms for the islands. The Spanish-era arms of the City of Manila were used until 1905, when the Philippine Commission adopted the "new arms and great seal of the Philippine Islands" designed by Gaillard Hunt of the US State Department. It consisted of thirteen alternating red-and-white stripes representing the Thirteen Colonies; a chief blue above, the honor color, and over them in an oval the arms of Manila with the castle of Spain and the sea lion prominently displayed. It also bore as its crest an American eagle, the symbol of United States. Beneath the shield was the scroll with the words Philippine Islands. It remained unaltered until the inauguration of Commonwealth of the Philippines in 1935.

Commonwealth Era
During the Commonwealth, extensive reform was made to the government in preparation for Philippine independence. One of major changes was changing the symbol for Filipinos. "The Arms and Great Seal of the Commonwealth Government of the Philippines" was approved in 1935, the number of stripes reduced from thirteen to two and three five-pointed stars added. The sea lion was made gold instead of silver and the eagle was slightly enlarged and placed closer to the arm. The word Commonwealth of the Philippines replaced Philippine Islands in the scroll below; it also incorporated the modified coat of arms of the City of Manila.

On December 15, 1938, President Manuel L. Quezon created the Special Committee of Arms of the Philippines. After almost two years of study, the committee recommended certain modifications to the coat of arms of the Commonwealth of the Philippines. They recommended that the eight-ray Philippine sun must be the point of honor. It was revised in 1940. It featured two stripes, blue on the sinister (right) side and red on the dexter (left) side of the shield; a white field above, studded with three five-pointed stars equidistant from each other; over them, the eight-rayed sun with each ray flanked on both sides by minor rays inside an oval. On the crest is the American eagle, its talon grasping an olive branch with eight leaves and eight fruits, and the left talon grasping three spears. Beneath the shield was the scroll with the inscription Philippines.

After providing the various branches of the government with their own symbols, President Quezon created the Philippine Heraldic Committee in 1940. The committee was assigned the studying and recommending the designs and symbolism for official seals of Philippines' political subdivision, cities, and government institutions.

The 1941 coat of arms was short-lived and the 1938 iteration of the symbol was restored. Both symbols were also used as a presidential symbol through executive orders.

The heraldic work of the committee was suspended during the Pacific War.

Second Philippine Republic
During the Second Philippine Republic, a more nationalistic policy were adopted and the seal was revised. Foreign components of the Filipino heraldic symbol which previously represented its colonial links to Spain and United States were removed. Instead, salient features of the flag and seal of the short-lived Philippine Republic were incorporated, consisting of the eight-ray mythological sun and three stars located beneath the equilateral triangle. Written within three sets of two marginal lines of the three sides of the triangle were Kalayaan, Kapayapaan, Katarungan (Liberty, Peace, Justice). Around the seal was a double marginal circle within which was written Republika ng Pilipinas (Republic of the Philippines).

Post World War II and full independence
After World War II, President Sergio Osmeña reactivated the Philippine Heraldic Committee. The current design pursuant to Commonwealth Act No. 731 was approved by the Congress of the Philippines on July 3, 1946. It was designed by Captain Galo B. Ocampo, Secretary of the Philippine Heraldry Committee.

During the administration of President Ferdinand Marcos, Isang Bansa, Isang Diwa (One Nation, One Spirit) became the national motto of the Philippines. It was immediately incorporated into the national seal, replacing the words Republic of the Philippines, which were originally inscribed in a scroll beneath the arms. The decree for this purpose was approved by the Office of the President on June 9, 1978. However, during the administration of President Corazon Aquino in 1986, the decree was revoked and reinstated the full English name of the country. The Administrative Code of 1987 provided that the inscription on the scroll could also be rendered in the national language.

The original English words were replaced by its Filipino translation, Republika ng Pilipinas, pursuant to Republic Act No. 8491 on February 12, 1998, coinciding with the centennial of the Philippine declaration of independence.

Chronology

Spanish East Indies 
During the Spanish colonial period, the lesser arms of the Spanish Sovereign were used. The seal of Manila was also issued under royal decree by Philip II (for whom the islands were named) in 1596. Note that the Pillars of Hercules or the Golden Fleece were not always displayed and the arms themselves were sometimes solely used.

First Philippine Republic 
After the expulsion of the Spanish colonial government by the Philippine Revolutionary Army and the Malolos Constitution was ratified, the government had formally been established.

Commonwealth and Second world war eras 
After the signing of the 1898 Treaty of Paris that ended the Spanish–American War, Spain ceded control of the Philippines and several other possessions to the United States of America. The following arms were used in the period after the cession, during the Commonwealth, and throughout the Second World War.

Sovereignty 
The following were used upon the Islands' achievement of full sovereignty in 1946. The arms as designed by Captain Galo B. Ocampo have retained their basic design since, with only minor alterations made due to political and cultural considerations.

In sport
A stylized form of the arms was formerly used on the jersey of the Philippine men's national basketball team, and appears with the word "Pilipinas" emblazoned above it. In addition, many coats of arms of national and private institutions, as well as Philippine towns and cities, are inspired by the national coat of arms.

See also 
 Flag of the Philippines
 Great Seal of the Philippines

References

External links

 Malacañan Presidential Museum
 Coat of arms under American administration
 Seals of the Katipunan 
 Illustrations of Coats of arms of the Philippines: American administration, Commonwealth and Proposed

National symbols of the Philippines
Philippines
Philippines
Philippines
Philippines
Philippines
Philippines
Philippines
Philippines